"Padaj silo i nepravdo" is a Yugoslav revolutionary song inspired by the Hvar Rebellion. It is based on "Slobodarka", a 1908 song written by Josip Smodlaka. The song first appeared on the island of Hvar in 1922.

During World War II, the song was popular among Yugoslav Partisans, particularly those from Dalmatia. 

The song gained prominence after being featured in the film Battle of Neretva. It was also featured in Pljuni i zapjevaj moja Jugoslavijo, a 1986 studio album by Bijelo Dugme, a prominent Yugoslav rock band.

Lyrics

There are other versions in which the name "Matija Ivanić" is replaced with "Vladimir Ilyich", the first name and patronymic of Vladimir Ilyich Lenin ("Matija Ivaniću!" replaced with "Vladimire Iljiču!").

See also
Hvar
Yugoslav People's Liberation War

References

Works cited
 

Croatian folk songs
History of Dalmatia
Political songs
Yugoslav Partisan songs